Parapercis banoni is a fish species in the sandperch family, Pinguipedidae. It is found in the Southeastern Atlantic at a place called the Valdivia Bank.

Etymology
The fish is named in honor of fisheries ecologist Rafael Bañón Diaz (b. 1961), who first reported the species  in 2000 and provided specimens and color photographs of the fish.

References

Pinguipedidae
Taxa named by John Ernest Randall
Taxa named by Takeshi Yamakawa
Fish described in 2006